The second season of Australian reality television series House Rules, also known as House Rules 2014, was confirmed in 2013 and began airing on 30 April 2014. The series is produced by the team who created the Seven reality show My Kitchen Rules and is hosted by Johanna Griggs.

This season of House Rules places six new teams renovating each other's homes and further challenges for the ultimate prize of a full mortgage payment.

Contestant Teams

This season of House Rules introduced six new teams. All teams are from different states in Australia.

Elimination history

Competition Details

Phase 1: Interior Renovation

The interior renovation round followed similar rules to season 1. New advantages such as being able to allocate zones for the other teams or receiving additional hints from the owners through an online chat or video, were awarded to the top scorers of the week. Also for the first time, judges scored and critiqued in front of the teams rather than receiving a recap of the comments from the host (Jo). The team with the lowest combined score is eliminated as the other teams progress to the next stage of the competition

New South Wales: Candy & Ryan
 Episodes 1 to 4
 Airdate — 30 April to 5 May 2014
 Description — Candy & Ryan from Emu Plains, New South Wales are the first team to hand over their keys for renovation.

Western Australia: Carole & Russell
 Episodes 5 to 8
 Airdate — 6 to 12 May 2014
 Description — Carole & Russell from Perth Hills, Western Australia are the second team to hand over their keys for renovation.
Previous winner's advantage: Carole & Russell — As it was there renovation, they got to choose one luxury item to add to the house, they chose a spa.
Previous loser's disadvantage: Adam & Lisa — Camping in the back yard in a tent during the renovation.

Victoria: Adam & Lisa
 Episodes 9 to 12
 Airdate — 13 to 19 May 2014
 Description — Adam & Lisa from Melbourne, Victoria are the third team to hand over their keys for renovation.
Previous winner's advantage: Maddi & Lloyd — Allocating the zones for themselves and all other teams.
Previous loser's disadvantage: Brooke & Grant — Camping in the back yard in a tent during the renovation.

Tasmania: Brooke & Grant
 Episodes 13 to 16
 Airdate — 20 to 26 May 2014
 Description — Brooke & Grant from Huon Valley, Tasmania are the fourth team to hand over their keys for renovation. Their house is the first in House Rules history to receive an extension. Four bedrooms belong to their children Hayden, Logan, Oliver, Patrick, Harrison, Riley & Mihayla.
Previous winner's advantage: Bomber & Mel — They got to decide on which zone they wanted to renovate and an online call to the homeowners regarding the styling direction of the renovation
Previous loser's disadvantage: Carole & Russell — Although Brooke & Grant and Carole & Russell both came equal last, Brooke & Grant do not participate in the renovation of their own home, therefore the loser's tent was given to the equal-lowest scorer.

 - For the Tasmania home renovation, there were a few minor changes made to the usual competition format. Unlike other renovated homes, a majority of the existing internal layout remained the same, meaning teams did not need to mark out their zone spaces. This house was also given an extension to accommodate a family of 9. Zones and room spaces for the extension were also pre-decided.
During this renovation, some teams were allocated a kids' bedroom in their zone, and were given additional hints to what the kids want in their rooms, on top of the main five house rules.

Queensland: Maddi & Lloyd
 Episodes 17 to 20
 Airdate — 27 May to 1 June 2014
 Description — Maddi & Lloyd from Townsville, Queensland are the fifth team to hand over their keys for renovation.
Previous winner's advantage: Carole & Russell — Allocating the zones for themselves and all other teams.
Previous loser's disadvantage: Adam & Lisa — Camping in the back yard in a tent during the renovation.

 - Adam and Lisa were awarded the first ever perfect score in the interior rounds for this renovation.

South Australia: Bomber & Mel
 Episodes 21 to 24
 Airdate — 3 to 9 June 2014
 Description — Bomber & Mel from Adelaide, South Australia are the sixth and final team to hand over their keys for the interior renovation phase. Four bedrooms belong to their children Abby, Kaitlin, Ethan & Jordan. The lowest scoring team overall will be eliminated.
Previous winner's advantage: Adam & Lisa — A secret brief from the homeowners relevant to their zone
Previous loser's disadvantage: Brooke & Grant — Although Bomber & Mel were the lowest scoring team in the previous week, they do not participate in the renovation of their own home and because it was their own home they got to choose who got the tent and they chose Brooke and Grant.

During this renovation, some teams were allocated a kids' bedroom in their zone, and were given additional hints to what the kids want in their rooms, on top of the main five house rules. Abby was a clear favourite to bomber and mel. Bomber and mel have now split up and Mel and her daughter Abby live together in the house and Bomber and Jordan live together in a rental house, while Ethan and Kaitlin are living with their mum.

Phase 2 and 3

Teams competed in two challenges. To make it a level playing field, all scores from the previous round were wiped clean. After both challenges were complete, scores are combined and the lowest scoring team is eliminated.

Phase 2: Unit makeover
 Episodes 25 & 26
 Airdate — 10 & 11 June 2014
 Description — Teams were each required to renovate a unit apartment in four days. The homeowners of the units each filmed a video brief for the teams to follow, outlining the styles and theme they wish to have in their homes. Teams must stay together during this challenge, meaning team's partners could not leave without the other. At the end, the highest scoring team will gain an advantage at the next challenge.

Phase 3: 24 Hour Fix-Up
 Episodes 27 & 28
 Airdate — 15 & 16 June 2014
 Description — For this challenge, teams headed back to their renovated homes and must fix or re-do one of the zones in 24 hours. With a $5000 budget, teams need to recreate the space/s to reflect their own style and also to impress the judges. 
Previous winner's advantage: Candy & Ryan — Received an additional $1000 to their budget.

Phase 4: Gardens and Exteriors

The top 4 teams are challenged to transform the exteriors and gardens of each other's homes. Two teams are allocated to a home (that do not belong to them) and must renovate either the front or back yards, as well as improving the house exterior. For each house, the owners also left an exclusive item that must be used in the zone. The semifinals are held over two rounds and after both rounds are complete, the lowest scoring team is eliminated.

Round 1

 Episodes 29 & 30
 Airdate —  17 to 22 June 2014
 Description — In round 1 of the exterior renovations, the 4 remaining teams head to West Sydney and Perth Hills to transform the gardens and house exterior in 3 and a half days. Teams are allocated to the front or back yard of either Candy & Ryan's or Carole & Russell's house.

Round 2

 Episodes 31 & 32
 Airdate —  23 to 24 June 2014
 Description — The teams continue on to round 2 of the exterior renovations in Townsville and Melbourne to transform the gardens and house exterior in 3 and a half days. Teams are allocated to the front or back yard of either Maddi & Lloyd's or Adam & Lisa's house. At the end of this round, the lowest scoring team will be eliminated.

Phase 5: Barnardos Charity House

 Episodes 33 to 36
 Airdate — 25 June to 2 July 2014
 Description — The top 3 teams give this old charity house a new interior makeover. The house belongs to the Barnardos Australia charity and is used as a holiday home for foster families. Rules for this challenge are very similar to the first interior renovations, where each team must renovate an allocated zone. This was selected through a random card draw. The winning two teams advance to the Grand Final, as one more is eliminated.

Grand Final: Final Renovation and Australia's Vote

 Episode 37
 Airdate — 6 July 2014
 Description — The final two teams completed one final challenge at their opponent's home, renovating a spare/secret room into a themed bar and spa area. The Australian public also voted for their favourite team to win. The winner was decided by a combination of the judges score, for the final project and overall viewer votes.

 Note:
 - Final result combines both the judge's scores and the results from Australia's vote.

Ratings

 Colour key:
  – Highest rating during the season
  – Lowest rating during the season

Ratings data used is from OzTAM and represents the live and same day average viewership from the 5 largest Australian metropolitan centres (Sydney, Melbourne, Brisbane, Perth and Adelaide).

Notes
Melbourne, Adelaide & Perth only
Sydney & Brisbane only

References

2014 Australian television seasons